The Big Four, sometimes referred to as The Big 4, is the name given in fashion to the four most notable Vogue covers; American Vogue, British Vogue, Vogue France and Vogue Italia. The term is commonly used when a model completes all four covers and is considered one of the biggest achievements in the fashion industry.

Records

Most Vogue covers 

The record of most Vogue covers currently belongs to Lauren Hutton with 40 covers.

Youngest Big 4 

The youngest model to ever cover the Big 4 was Karolina Kurkova, who was 17. In 2020, Kaia Gerber covered the Big 4, at age 18. She is currently the second-youngest model to accomplish the Big 4. Kurkova has been the record holder since 2001, the same year Gerber was born.

Musicians 
Singers Madonna and Rihanna are the only two musicians to ever cover the Big 4.

List of models who covered all four 

 Adut Akech
 Amber Valletta
 Angela Lindvall
 Arizona Muse
 Bella Hadid
 Bridget Hall
 Carmen Kass
 Carol Alt
 Carolyn Murphy
 Christy Turlington
 Cindy Crawford
 Claudia Schiffer
 Daria Werbowy
 Deborah Dixon
 Donna Mitchell
 Edie Campbell
 Estelle Lefebure
 Eva Voorhees
 Frankie Rayder
 Gemma Ward
 Gia Carangi
 Gigi Hadid
 Gisele Bundchen
 Helena Christensen
 Imaan Hammam
 Isabella Rossellini
 Jacki Adams
 Jean Shrimpton
 Jerry Hall
 Jessica Stam
 Jill Kortleve
 Karen Elson
 Kaia Gerber
 Karolina Kurkova
 Kate Moss
 Kim Alexis
 Lara Stone
 Linda Evangelista
 Madonna
 Margaux Hemingway
 Marisa Berenson
 Meghan Douglas
 Nadja Auermann
 Naomi Campbell
 Natalia Vodianova
 Renee Simonsen
 Rihanna
 Rosemary McGrotha
 Sasha Pivovarova
 Shalom Harlow
 Stephanie Seymour
 Tatjana Patitz
 Twiggy
 Veruschka
 Vittoria Ceretti
 Wilhelmina Cooper

References

Fashion magazines